"Cowboys and Clowns" is a song written by Steve Dorff, Snuff Garrett, Gary Harju and Larry Herbstritt, and recorded by American country music artist Ronnie Milsap.  It was released in June 1980 and is featured on the soundtrack for the film Bronco Billy.  The song was Milsap's fifteenth number one on the country chart.  The single stayed number one for one week and spent a total of twelve weeks on the country chart.

The song was issued as a double A-side with a cover of Porter Wagoner's 1962 hit "Misery Loves Company".

Charts

References

1980 singles
Ronnie Milsap songs
Songs written for films
Songs written by Steve Dorff
Songs written by Snuff Garrett
Song recordings produced by Snuff Garrett
RCA Records singles
1980 songs